Trefcon is a commune in the Aisne department in Hauts-de-France in northern France.

An old alternative name was Saint-Martin-des-Prés. Named after the old ruined church of the same name.

Population

See also
Communes of the Aisne department

References

Communes of Aisne
Aisne communes articles needing translation from French Wikipedia